Bracon is a commune in the Jura department in Bourgogne-Franche-Comté in eastern France.

Local tradition holds that St. Claudius of Besançon was born here in the 7th century.

Population

See also
Communes of the Jura department

References

Communes of Jura (department)